Elvis the King is a box set comprising 18 singles of the recorded work of American singer and musician Elvis Presley, released in 2007 by RCA Records. The box set is available in both CD and 10" vinyl formats.

The first release was Monday, August 13, 2007, marking 30 years—to the week—since the death of Elvis Presley. The second single was released on Thursday, August 16, which is the exact anniversary of Presley's death. From then on, the singles were released every Monday until December 2, 2007.

Releases and chart positions
Note: original chart positions are in brackets

August 20 also saw the release of the HMV-exclusive single My Baby Left Me, which is also available on CD and 10" vinyl format. This reached #19 in the UK.

Compilation CD
As well as the box set, a 2-disc compilation album of Presley's work was also released. The album reached No. 1 in the UK and Germany, Presley's first No. 1 album in the latter. As of January 27, 2018, the album was certified with a Double Platinum ARIA award in Australia, totalling sales in excess of 140,000.

Track listing
Disc 1:
 "Suspicious Minds"
 "Blue Suede Shoes"
 "Jailhouse Rock"
 "Love Me Tender"
 "Don't Be Cruel"
 "King Creole"
 "Hard Headed Woman"
 "All Shook Up"
 "Hound Dog"
 "Too Much"
 "Heartbreak Hotel"
 "(Let Me Be Your) Teddy Bear"
 "Good Rockin' Tonight"
 "That's All Right"
 "One Night"
 "(Now and Then There's) A Fool Such as I"
 "A Big Hunk o' Love"
 "Wear My Ring Around Your Neck"
 "Crying in the Chapel"
 "Stuck on You"
 "Kentucky Rain"
 "Viva Las Vegas"
 "Devil in Disguise"
 "Guitar Man"
 "A Little Less Conversation"
 "Welcome to My World"
Disc 2:
 "Mystery Train"
 "Love Me"
 "In the Ghetto"
 "Burning Love"
 "Always on My Mind"
 "The Wonder of You"
 "I Just Can’t Help Believin’"
 "I Want To Be Free"
 "You Don’t Have to Say You Love Me"
 "An American Trilogy"
 "Are You Lonesome Tonight"
 "Can’t Help Falling in Love"
 "Rock A Hula Baby"
 "Return to Sender"
 "Don’t"
 "(Marie's the Name) His Latest Flame"
 "Good Luck Charm"
 "Surrender"
 "She’s Not You"
 "A Mess of Blues"
 "It’s Now or Never"
 "Fever"
 "Moody Blue"
 "Way Down"
 "My Way"
 "If I Can Dream"

Charts

Weekly charts

Year-end charts

Certifications

References

External links
Elvis The King UK - Official UK site

Elvis Presley compilation albums
2007 compilation albums
RCA Records compilation albums
Compilation albums published posthumously